Adam Robinson (born 8 April 1987) is a professional rugby league footballer who plays in Betfred League 1 for Hunslet.

Robinson initially joined York on-loan in June 2016 and scored three tries in his four games including twice on his debut against Oxford. His move to York was made permanent with the offer of a one-year deal for the 2017 season, which was later extended until the end of 2018.

In October 2018 he signed a one-year deal with Hunslet.

References

External links
Stanley Rangers ARLFC - Roll of Honour
Statistics at orl-heritagetrust.org.uk

1987 births
Living people
Batley Bulldogs players
Dewsbury Rams players
Doncaster R.L.F.C. players
English rugby league players
Halifax R.L.F.C. players
Hunslet R.L.F.C. players
Oldham R.L.F.C. players
Place of birth missing (living people)
Rugby league players from Yorkshire
Rugby league props
Rugby league second-rows
York City Knights players